Lesbian, gay, bisexual, and transgender (LGBT) people living in Rwanda face legal challenges not experienced by non-LGBT residents. While neither homosexuality nor homosexual acts are illegal, homosexuality is considered a taboo topic, and there is no significant public discussion of this issue in any region of the country. No special legislative protections are afforded to LGBT citizens, and same-sex marriages are not recognized by the state, as the Constitution of Rwanda provides that "[o]nly civil monogamous marriage between a man and a woman is recognized". LGBT Rwandans have reported being harassed, blackmailed, and even arrested by the police under various laws dealing with public order and morality.

Rwanda is a signatory of the United Nations joint statement condemning violence against LGBT people, being one of the only few countries in Africa to have sponsored the declaration, and stands in sharp contrast with neighbouring Uganda, Tanzania and Burundi. Rwanda and Djibouti are the only East African countries where homosexual acts are legal.

History

Kingdom of Rwanda
In the old Kingdom of Rwanda, male homosexual relations were common among young Hutus and Tutsis. In 1986, a 19-year-old Tutsi man was recorded as saying that "traditionally, in his tribe, there was an extended period during which boys lived apart from the rest of the village while they are training to be warriors, during which very emotional, and often sexual, relationships were struck up... Sometimes these relationships lasted beyond adolescence into adulthood. Watusi still have a reputation for bisexuality in the cities of East Africa." Tutsi boys training at court would often be made sexually available to guests. Sexual relations are believed to have included mutual masturbation, intercrural sex and anal intercourse.

Societal acceptance quickly disappeared after the arrival of the European colonialists and Christianity.

Republic of Rwanda
On 16 December 2009, the Parliament of Rwanda debated whether to make homosexuality a criminal offense, with a punishment of 5–10 years imprisonment. This legislation was similar to the controversial anti-homosexuality bill in the neighboring country of Uganda. Justice Minister Tharcisse Karugarama, however, condemned and refuted reports that the government intended to criminalize homosexual acts, saying that sexual orientation is a private matter, not a state business.

Legality of same-sex sexual activity
Same-sex sexual activity is legal in Rwanda. The age of consent is 18, regardless of sexual orientation or gender.

Recognition of same-sex relationships
Rwanda does not recognize same-sex marriages, civil unions or similar unions. Most gay people who have been interviewed stated that they are not open about their sexuality to their family for fear of being rejected.

The Constitution of Rwanda, adopted in May 2003, defines marriage as a union between a man and a woman. Article 26 states: "Only civil monogamous marriage between a man and a woman is recognized."

Government and politics

Political parties
Under Rwandan electoral laws, most of the political parties are aligned with, if not an extension of, the ruling party. The four Rwandan political parties that are not a part of the ruling coalition, the Liberal Party, the Social Democratic Party, the Social Party Imberakuri and the Democratic Green Party of Rwanda, have not taken an official position on LGBT rights.

In September 2016, speaking in San Francisco, President Paul Kagame said that "it (homosexuality) hasn't been our problem. And we don't intend to make it our problem".

Human rights
Since 2005, the Horizons Community Association of Rwanda has been doing some public advocacy on behalf of LGBT rights, although its members have often been harassed by the government.

Society and culture 

The U.S. Department of State's Country Reports on Human Rights Practices for 2016 stated that:

Acts of Violence, Discrimination, and Other Abuses Based on Sexual Orientation and Gender IdentityThere are no laws that criminalize sexual orientation or consensual same-sex sexual conduct, and cabinet-level government officials expressed support for the rights of lesbian, gay, bisexual, transgender, and intersex (LGBTI) persons.  LGBTI persons reported societal discrimination and abuse, and LGBTI rights groups reported occasional harassment by neighbors and police. There were no known reports of physical attacks against LGBTI persons, nor were there any reports of LGBTI persons fleeing the country due to harassment or attack.

In 2007, the Anglican Church of Rwanda condemned "the non-biblical behaviors" of the European and American churches and insisted that they would not support the ordination of LGBT clergy.

In September 2019, Albert Nabonibo, a well-known gospel singer, came out as gay in an interview with a Christian YouTube channel. The Associated Press reported that his coming out had caused "shock" in a country "where such a public assertion of homosexuality is unheard of". Despite "horrible" reactions from family and friends, Olivier Nduhungirehe, the Minister of State for East African Community Affairs, expressed support for Nabonibo, saying, "All Rwandans are born and remain equal in rights and freedoms." Nabonibo himself stated that "there is no going back, because I have to live my real life."

Transgender rights
Transgender Rwandans face legal challenges. Rwandan law forbids changing legal gender. While crossdressing is not de jure illegal in Rwanda, transgender people are often charged with unrelated offenses and can face violent detention.

Summary table

See also

Human rights in Rwanda
LGBT rights in Africa

Notes

References

LGBT in Rwanda
Politics of Rwanda
Rwanda
Law of Rwanda
Human rights in Rwanda